Gbéléban Department is a department of Kabadougou Region in Denguélé District, Ivory Coast. In 2021, its population was 29,532 and its seat is the settlement of Gbéléban. The sub-prefectures of the department are Gbéléban, Samango and Seydougou.

History
Gbéléban Department was created in 2012 by dividing Odienné Department.

Notes

States and territories established in 2012
2012 establishments in Ivory Coast
Departments of Kabadougou